is a 1988 beat 'em up arcade video game developed and published by Irem in Japan and Europe, and published in North America by Data East. It is considered as a spiritual sequel to Irem's earlier Kung-Fu Master (1984).

Plot
The game takes place in downtown New York City. The game's plot involves a lone, professional martial artist who became a vigilante to fight an evil gang called the Skinheads ruled by a man known as the Giant Devil, in order to protect his "turf" and save a female hostage named Madonna, who was kidnapped by them.

Gameplay

Players control the titular character using punches and kicks to defeat the Skinheads in a 2D platform manner, while sometimes picking up and using nunchaku against them. If players get hurt while holding nunchuku, they become unarmed. There are five stages in order of appearance: a street, a junkyard, the Brooklyn Bridge, a back street scene and on top of a building that is under construction. Skinheads with Mohawk or spiked hairdo attack the vigilante with knives, chains, motorbikes, guns and other kinds of weapons. They will also choke him if he lets them get too close.

Development
An arcade sequel to Kung-Fu Master called Beyond Kung-Fu: Return of the Master was developed by Irem and underwent location testing in 1987, but was shelved after it underperformed. The Kung-Fu sequel was then revamped into Vigilante, after Irem decided to give the game a more Americanized setting, which was released in 1988.

Ports
The arcade game was later ported to several different home computers and consoles. The Sega Master System version was published exclusively in North America and Europe by Sega, and is one of several games in the console to include an FM sound switch for enhanced music quality. In the Sega Master System version, Madonna was renamed "Maria" and the Skinheads were called the "Rogues".

The ones for Commodore 64, ZX Spectrum, Atari ST, Amiga and the Amstrad CPC were reprogrammed by Emerald Software and published by U.S. Gold mostly in Europe. The MSX version was ported and published by Korean company Clover.

The TurboGrafx-16 version was ported and published in Japan on January 14, 1989 by Irem and published in North America by NEC the same year. This port matches the arcade more than other ports. The TurboGrafx-16 version was later re-released globally for Nintendo's Virtual Console for the Wii in North America on February 5, 2007, in Japan on February 6, 2007, in Europe on February 9, 2007, and in Australia on July 6, 2007, but was delisted on March 30, 2012 (on March 31 in Europe) before it returned in September 2013. It was also released for the Wii U Virtual Console in Japan on February 10, 2015, in North America on September 14, 2017 and in Europe on October 5, 2017.

Reception 

In Japan, Game Machine listed Vigilante on their April 15, 1988 issue as being the second most-successful table arcade unit of the month.

Your Sinclair gave the arcade game a positive review, stating it was "a pretty good game" with "loads" of enemies, "crunchingly realistic" sound effects, "beautifully detailed" sprite graphics and "really smooth" movement animation. They later described the ZX Spectrum version as a "Pretty standard beat 'em up" that "You've probably seen" before, saying players should "only buy if you're addicted to the genre and you've already got the better ones."

Computer and Video Games gave the PC Engine version a positive review, stating it was "a good game, even second time" around, the graphics are "perfectly defined and beautifully" animated, and that "any beat 'em up fan should check out Vigilante without delay."

References

External links
 Arcade version

Vigilante at arcade-history
 Home versions

1988 video games
Amstrad CPC games
Arcade video games
Atari ST games
Amiga games
Commodore 64 games
Data East video games
Irem games
MSX games
Master System games
Side-scrolling beat 'em ups
Single-player video games
TurboGrafx-16 games
U.S. Gold games
Video games developed in Japan
Video games set in New York City
Virtual Console games
Virtual Console games for Wii U
ZX Spectrum games
Data East arcade games